Dzwonowo  (formerly ) is a village in the administrative district of Gmina Człopa, within Wałcz County, West Pomeranian Voivodeship, in north-western Poland.

References

Villages in Wałcz County